Horst Hamm (17 March 1916 – 19 February 1943) was a German U-boat commander in World War II.

Naval career
Horst Hamm joined the Kriegsmarine (German navy) in 1935. From August 1939 to May 1940 he served as the Second Watch Officer (2WO) on the  spending 120 days at sea on four patrols. From June to August 1940 he served with the 1st U-boat Flotilla before being sent as First Watch Officer on the famous  in September. With the U-96 Hamm went out on three patrols spending 70 days at sea. On his first patrol with this boat they sank five ships (37,037 GRT) and damaged two more (15,864). The second patrol was also successful but the third patrol saw the boat sink 7 ships with a total of 45,391 GRT. 190 days at sea during 7 patrols on two U-boats under very competent Commanders gave Hamm invaluable experience for his own command. He got his own boat on 7 April 1941 when he took command of the small school boat  for 5 months. Hamm got his second boat, the larger , on 4 September 1941. Hamm would take his U-562 out on eight patrols, 241 days at sea, from September 1941. During this time he sank six ships with a total of 37,287 GRT and damaged one merchant of 3,359 GRT. On 27 November 1941 U-562 passed the dangerous Straits of Gibraltar into the Mediterranean. The boat thus left the Atlantic for good, having completed one patrol there. Hamm and his entire crew of 49 men died when the U-562 was sunk in the Mediterranean north-east of Benghazi, Libya by depth charges from the British destroyer , the British escort destroyer  and a British Wellington aircraft.

Ships attacked

See also
 List of people who disappeared mysteriously at sea

References

Bibliography

1916 births
1940s missing person cases
1943 deaths
Kriegsmarine personnel killed in World War II
Military personnel from Düsseldorf
People lost at sea
Reichsmarine personnel
U-boat commanders (Kriegsmarine)
Deaths by airstrike during World War II